Aurora Augusta Figueiredo de Carvalho Homem (13 November 1937 – 11 June 2010), known by her pen name Maria Aurora, was a Portuguese journalist, poet, novelist, children's writer and television presenter.

Although born in Viseu District, in 1974 she settled on Madeira Island, where her contributions to culture were greatly appreciated.
Funchal's City Council pays tribute to her work by hosting an award for essays on gender equality and having a street named after her.

Works

Poetry
Raízes do silêncio, Funchal, 1982.
Ilha a duas vozes, Funchal, 1988, com João Carlos Abreu.
Cintilações, Funchal, 1994, com João Lemos Gomes.
Uma voz de muda espera: monografia sentimental, São Pedro do Sul, 1995.
12 textos de desejo, Funchal, 2003.
Antes que a noite caia, Vila Nova de Gaia, 2005.
Discurso amoroso, Porto, 2006.

Fiction
A Santa do Calhau: contos, Lisboa, 1992.
Para ouvir Albinoni, Ponta Delgada, 1995.
Leila: contos, Vila Nova de Gaia, 2005.

Non-fiction
Discurs(ilha)ndo: crónicas, Funchal, 1999.

Children's
Vamos cantar histórias, Funchal, 1989.
Juju, a tartaruga, Lisboa, 1991.Loma, o lobo marinho, Vila Nova de Gaia, 2005.Zina, a baleia azul, Vila Nova de Gaia, 2007.Maria e a estrela do mar, Vila Nova de Gaia, 2007.A fada Ofélia e o véu da noiva, Vila Nova de Gaia, 2008.A cidade do Funcho: a primeira viagem de João Gonçalves da Câmara, Vila Nova de Gaia, 2008.Uma escadinha para o Menino Jesus, Vila Nova de Gaia, 2008.Pedro pesquito e a Câmara dos Lobos, Vila Nova de Gaia, 2009.O anjo Tobias e a rochinha de Natal, Vila Nova de Gaia, 2009.A fada Íris e a floresta mágica, Vila Nova de Gaia, 2009.Marta, Xispas e a gruta misteriosa, Vila Nova de Gaia, 2010.

 Works 
Poetry
 Raízes do silêncio, Funchal, 1982
 Ilha a duas vozes, Funchal, 1988, with João Carlos Abreu
 Cintilações, Funchal, 1994, with João Lemos Gomes
 Uma voz de muda espera: monografia sentimental, S. Pedro do Sul, 1995
 12 textos de desejo, Funchal, 2003
 Antes que a noite caia, Vila Nova de Gaia, 2005
 Discurso amoroso. Editor Campo das letras, Porto. 89 pp. Ilustró Francisco Simões, 2006

Fiction
 A Santa do Calhau: contos, Lisboa. Editor Noticias, 176 pp. . 1992
 Para ouvir Albinoni, Ponta Delgada, 1995. Vol. 6 de Colecção Autores da Madeira. Editor Campo das Letras, 92 pp. . 2003
 Leila: contos, Vila Nova de Gaia, 88 pp. . 2005
 Zina, a baleia azul. Ilustró Sónia Cântara. Lisboa. Editor 7 Dias 6 Noites, 24 pp. . 2007

Anthologies 
 Pontos luminosos: Açores e Madeira: antologia de poesia do século XX. Vol. 149 de Fora de colecção. Con Urbano Bettencourt, Diana Pimentel. Editor Campo das Letras, 191 pp. . 2006
 São Vicente em fundo: antologia dos prémios do conto "Horácio Bento de Gouveia". Lisboa. Editor 7 Dias 6 Noites, 293 pp. . 2009

Works for children
 Vamos cantar histórias, Funchal, 1989
 Juju a tartaruga, Lisboa. Con Maurício Fernandes. Lisboa. Editor Notícias, 191 pp. . 1991
 Maria e a estrela do mar, Vila Nova de Gaia. Lisboa. Editor 7 Dias 6 Noites, 32 pp. . 2007
 A fada Ofélia e o Véu da Noiva. Ilustró José Nelson Pestana Henriques, Vila Nova de Gaia. Lisboa. Editor 7 Dias 6 Noites, 48 pp. . 2008
 A cidade do Funcho: a primeira viagem de João Gonçalves da Câmara. Ilustró José Nelson Pestana Henriques, Vila Nova de Gaia. Lisboa. Editor 7 Dias 6 Noites, 56 pp. . 2008
 Uma escadinha para o Menino Jesus. Ilustró José Nelson Pestana Henriques, Vila Nova de Gaia. Lisboa. Editor 7 Dias 6 Noites, 48 pp. . 2008
 Pedro pesquito e a Câmara dos Lobos. Ilustró José Nelson Pestana Henriques, Vila Nova de Gaia. Lisboa. Editor 7 Dias 6 Noites, 56 pp. . 2009
 O anjo Tobias e a rochinha de Natal. Ilustró José Nelson Pestana Henriques, Vila Nova de Gaia. Lisboa. Editor 7 Dias 6 Noites, 40 pp. . 2009
 A fada Íris e a floresta mágica. Ilustró Elisabete Henriques, Vila Nova de Gaia. Lisboa. Editor 7 Dias 6 Noites, 40 pp. . 2009
 Marta, Xispas e a gruta misteriosa''. Ilustró José Nelson Pestana Henriques, Vila Nova de Gaia. Lisboa. Editor 7 Dias 6 Noites, 32 pp. . 2010

References

Literature

1937 births
2010 deaths
21st-century Portuguese poets
Portuguese women short story writers
Portuguese short story writers
People from Funchal
20th-century Portuguese women writers
21st-century Portuguese women writers
21st-century Portuguese writers
20th-century Portuguese poets
Portuguese women poets
Portuguese children's writers